The 41st Annual American Music Awards was held on November 24, 2013 at the Nokia Theatre L.A. Live in Los Angeles. The awards recognized the most popular artists and albums of 2013. It was broadcast live on ABC and CTV with Simultaneous substitution. The nominations were announced on October 10, 2013, by Kelly Clarkson and will.i.am. Macklemore & Ryan Lewis led the nominations with six, followed by Taylor Swift and Justin Timberlake with five. The show was hosted by Pitbull.

Taylor Swift was the biggest winner of the night with four wins including Artist of the Year, Favorite Pop/Rock Female Artist, Favorite Country Female Artist and Favorite Country Album. Justin Timberlake also won three awards for Favorite Pop/Rock Male Artist, Favorite Soul/R&B Male Artist and Favorite Soul/R&B Album.

Rihanna won the first-ever Icon Award, as well as winning Favorite Soul/R&B Female Artist.The Award of Merit was given to the late Celia Cruz

Performances

Presenters

 Taylor Swift
 Emma Roberts
 Marc Anthony
 Zoe Saldana
 Kristen Bell
 Chris Daughtry
 Akon
 Michael Bolton
 Maia Mitchell
 Naya Rivera
 Dave Grohl
 Joan Jett
 Pitbull
 Heidi Klum
 Kelly Osbourne
 Nicole Richie
 The Ceremonies
 Daisy Fuentes
 Juan Pablo Galavis
 Bill Maher
 Ciara
 Fall Out Boy
 Alicia Silverstone
 Nathan Fillion
 Sarah Silverman
 Jennifer Hudson
 Austin Mahone
 Kendall Jenner
 Jeremy Renner
 Jaimie Alexander
 Andrew McCutchen
 Cast of Shark Tank
 Lady Antebellum
 2 Chainz
 Jaden Smith

Winners and nominees

References

2013 music awards
2013
2013 awards in the United States
2013 in Los Angeles